The Men's Discus Throw at the 2005 World Championships in Athletics was held at the Helsinki Olympic Stadium on August 6 and August 7.

Medalists

Schedule
All times are Eastern European Time (UTC+2)

Abbreviations
All results shown are in metres

Qualifying

Group A
  Gerd Kanter, Estonia 65.76 m Q
  Jason Tunks, Canada 64.02 m Q
  Michael Möllenbeck, Germany 63.71 m Q
  Frantz Kruger, South Africa 63.44 m q
  Jarred Rome, United States 62.72 m q
  Carl Brown, United States 61.91 m
  Bogdan Pishchalnikov, Russia 61.91 m
  Jo Van Daele, Belgium 61.12 m
  Vasiliy Kaptyukh, Belarus 61.04 m
  Frank Casañas, Cuba 60.94 m
  Jorge Balliengo, Argentina 60.40 m
  Abbas Samimi, Iran 60.25 m
  Gábor Máté, Hungary 58.97 m
  Rutger Smith, Netherlands DNS

Group B
  Virgilijus Alekna, Lithuania 68.79 m Q
  Lars Riedel, Germany 66.22 m Q (SB)
  Mario Pestano, Spain 65.04 m Q
  Andrzej Krawczyk, Poland 64.51 m Q
  Zoltán Kővágó, Hungary 64.30 m Q
  Ian Waltz, United States 64.30 m Q
  Aleksander Tammert, Estonia 64.02 m Q
  Libor Malina, Czech Republic 62.41 m
  Vikas Gowda, India 62.04 m
  Roland Varga, Hungary 61.94 m
  Tao Wu, China 61.75 m
  Gaute Myklebust, Norway 60.00 m
  Timo Tompuri, Finland 59.11 m

Final

External links
IAAF results, heats
IAAF results, final

Discus
Discus throw at the World Athletics Championships